Baron Raglan, of Raglan in the County of Monmouth, is a title in the Peerage of the United Kingdom. It was created on 20 October 1852 for the military commander Lord FitzRoy Somerset, chiefly remembered as commander of the British troops during the Crimean War.

History
The title was created for Lord FitzRoy Somerset, the youngest son of Henry Somerset, 5th Duke of Beaufort (see Duke of Beaufort for earlier history of the family). His second but eldest surviving son, the second Baron, served as a Lord-in-waiting (government whip in the House of Lords) from 1866 to 1868 in the Conservative administrations of the Earl of Derby and Benjamin Disraeli. He was succeeded by his son, the third Baron. He held office as Under-Secretary of State for War between 1900 and 1902 in the Conservative government of Lord Salisbury. His eldest son, the fourth Baron, was a soldier and also served as Lord Lieutenant of Monmouthshire. The fifth Baron was active in the House of Lords but lost his seat in the upper chamber of parliament after the passing of the House of Lords Act 1999.  the title is held by the fourth Baron's third but second surviving son, the sixth Baron, who succeeded in 2010.

Like their Beaufort relatives, the Barons of Raglan can boast an unbroken line of male (but illegitimate) descent from Henry II and the earliest Plantagenets.
 
The family seat was Cefntilla Court, Llandenny in Monmouthshire. An inscription over the porch dated 1858 reads: "This house with 238 acres of land was purchased by 1623 of the friends, admirers and comrades in arms of the late Field Marshal Lord Raglan GCB and presented by them to his son and his heirs for ever in a lasting memorial of affectionate regard and respect". Memorials to a number of members of the Raglan branch of the Somerset family can be seen in St John's Church, the parish church of Llandenny.

The fifth baron willed Cefntilla to a nephew, the son of his sister, and not to the heirs of the barony, a decision which was contested. During the legal dispute, the Honourable Arthur Somerset, son and heir of the new Baron, died suddenly on 25 July 2012. The dispute was subsequently settled and Cefntilla sold.

Barons Raglan (1852)
FitzRoy James Henry Somerset, 1st Baron Raglan (1788–1855)
Richard Henry FitzRoy Somerset, 2nd Baron Raglan (1817–1884)
George FitzRoy Henry Somerset, 3rd Baron Raglan (1857–1921)
FitzRoy Richard Somerset, 4th Baron Raglan (1885–1964)
FitzRoy John Somerset, 5th Baron Raglan (1927–2010)
Geoffrey Somerset, 6th Baron Raglan (born 1932)
Hon. Arthur Geoffrey Somerset (1960–2012)

The heir apparent is the present holder's grandson Iñigo Arthur Fitzroy Somerset (born 2004).

See also
Duke of Beaufort
Viscount Somerset

References

External links
A Tribute to the Honourable Arthur Somerset: The King of the Events Industry
Battle to save Wellington legacy: A unique and important collection of military memorabilia with a fascinating history is in danger of being broken up
Family of military hero locked in battle over sale of treasures
Duke of Wellington's treasures in jeopardy

Baronies in the Peerage of the United Kingdom

Noble titles created in 1852
Noble titles created for UK MPs